The Men's Javelin Throw F42/44 had its Final held on September 12 at 19:00.

Medalists

Results

References
Final

Athletics at the 2008 Summer Paralympics